Strophocactus sicariguensis, synonym Pseudoacanthocereus sicariguensis, is a species of plant in the family Cactaceae. It is native to Colombia and Venezuela. It has often sprawling thin stems and white funnel-shaped flowers that open at night.

Description
Strophocactus sicariguensis grows as a shrub, initially upright and later sprawling. It branches freely from the base.

Taxonomy
Strophocactus sicariguensis was first described, as Acanthocereus sicariguensis, in 1947. It was transferred to the genus Pseudoacanthocereus as Pseudoacanthocereus sicariguensis by Nigel P. Taylor in 1992, a placement still accepted by some sources . A molecular phylogenetic study of the Hylocereeae by Korotkova et al. published in 2017 showed that Pseudoacanthocereus sicariguensis formed a clade with Strophocactus wittii and Pseudoacanthocereus brasiliensis (the only other species placed in Pseudoacanthocereus):

Accordingly, both species of Pseudoacanthocereus were transferred to Strophocactus.

Distribution
Strophocactus sicariguensis is native to Colombia and Venezuela, in particular around the Maracaibo Basin.

References

Echinocereeae
Flora of Colombia
Flora of Venezuela
Cacti of South America
Plants described in 1947